A meron or half-instanton is a Euclidean space-time solution of the Yang–Mills field equations. It is a singular non-self-dual solution of topological charge 1/2. The instanton is believed to be composed of two merons.

A meron can be viewed as a tunneling event between two Gribov vacua. In that picture, the meron is an event which starts from vacuum, then a Wu–Yang monopole emerges, which then disappears again to leave the vacuum in another Gribov copy.

See also
BPST instanton
Dyon
Instanton
Monopole

References

 Gauge Fields, Classification and Equations of Motion, Moshe Carmeli, Kh. Huleilil and Elhanan Leibowitz, World Scientific Publishing

Gauge theories
Quantum chromodynamics